Hyposidra talaca, the black looper or black inch worm, is a moth of the family Geometridae. The species was first described by Francis Walker in 1860. It is found from India to Indochina, Sundaland, Sulawesi, the Philippines, Sri Lanka, the Solomon Islands, Thailand, Taiwan, New Guinea and Australia, where it has been recorded from Queensland. It is a major defoliating pest in tea plantations.

Description
The wingspan is about 30 mm. Female with outer margin of hindwings hardly crenulate. Male with outer margin of neither wing excised. Antennae pectinated. Hindwings with outer margin angled at vein 4. Body dark olive fuscous, more or less irrorated and suffused with grey. Both wings faint traces of medial and crenulate postmedial lines. The cilia dark. Forewings with traces of antemedial line and more or less distinct sub-apical patch in male. Underside with crenulate postmedial line to both wings.

Larva is a looper, with body pinkish olive green, irrorated with black, and with dark patches on 4th and 6th somites. Later instars are uniform brown.

The larvae feed on the foliage of a wide range of plants, including Anacardium, Bombax, Terminalia, Chromolaena, Gynura, Mikania, Cupressus, Aleurites, Aporosa, Bischofia, Breynia, Glochidion, Hevea, Manihot, Ficus, Morus, Psidium, Polygonum, Rubus, Cinchona, Coffea, Mussaenda, Citrus, Euodia, Schleichera, Theobroma, Perilla frutescens, Camellia and Tectona species.

Eggs and caterpillars are largely susceptible for many parasitized hymenopterans, and birds.

Subspecies
Hyposidra talaca talaca
Hyposidra talaca schistacea Warren, 1896
Hyposidra talaca successaria (Walker, 1860)

References

External links

Egg-laying pattern of Hyposidra talaca (Lepidoptera: Geometridae) in Northeastern Indian tea plantations: implications for pest management
Fitness traits of the tea defoliator, Hyposidra talaca (Walker 1860) (Lepidoptera: Geometridae) on natural and artificial diets in relation to gut enzymes and nutritional efficiencies
Restriction endonuclease fragment analysis of Hyposidra talaca nucleopolyhedrovirus genome
Morphological diversity, developmental traits and seasonal occurrence of looper pests (Lepidoptera: Geometridae) of tea crop
In situ mortality of Hyposidra talaca (Geometridae: Lepidoptera) by its nucleopolyhedrovirus and comparison of tea production in untreated and chemical insecticide-treated plots
Range expansion of Hyposidra talaca (Geometridae: Lepidoptera), a major pest, to Northeastern Indian tea plantations: change of weather and anti-predatory behaviour of the pest as possible causes
Bio ecology and ecofriendly control of Hyposidra talaca walker Lepidoptera: Geometridae on some multipurpose tree species
Biology of Hyposidra talaca
First record of Hyposidra talaca Walker (Lepidoptera: Geometridae) on Perilla frutescens Linn.

Boarmiini
Moths described in 1860